Rak Santi Party () was a political party in Thailand founded on 21 April 2011 by Tawil Surachetpong and Purachai Piamsomboon is leader and Pornpen Petsuksiri is Secretary-General. It was dissolved by the Election Commission on 5 February 2019.

Election results

References

External links
http://www.tdw.polsci.chula.ac.th/?q=raksantiparty
พรรครักษ์สันติ

2011 establishments in Thailand
2019 disestablishments in Thailand
Defunct political parties in Thailand
Political parties disestablished in 2019
Political parties established in 2011